Iva Lewis Ropati is a New Zealand former professional rugby league  footballer who played in the 1980s and 1990s, and high school principal.

Early life

Ropati attended Lynfield College in Auckland.

Playing career

Early years
He grew up playing for the Otahuhu Leopards before moving to the Te Atatu Roosters where he won a Fox Memorial premiership. He later played for the Mangere East Hawks before moving to England. During the 1991 season Iva was able to twice line up alongside four of his brothers for Mangere East in the Auckland Rugby League competition. Iva played alongside Joe, John, Peter, and Tea.

Professional career
When he moved to England, Ropati played for the Sheffield Eagles, Featherstone Rovers and Oldham. Iva Ropati played right-, i.e. number 3, and scored a try in Featherstone Rovers' 14-20 defeat by Bradford Northern in the 1989 Yorkshire Cup Final during the 1989–90 season at Headingley Rugby Stadium, Leeds on Sunday 5 November 1989. He scored 30 tries for Sheffield in the 1991–92 season, which remained a club record until it was broken in 2012. In 1994 he moved to Australia to play for the Parramatta Eels in the NSWRL premiership. He finished his career with the new Auckland Warriors in 1996 and 1997. In 1998 he returned to the Auckland Rugby League competition, playing with the Manurewa Marlins. As an import player, he represented Taranaki in the 1998 National Provincial Competition.

Representative career
In 1993 Ropati was selected for the New Zealand national rugby league team and played in four test matches.

Later years
Ropati was one of six New Zealanders awarded a Sir Peter Blake emerging leadership award in 2009.

In 2009 he was appointed to the new Counties Manukau Zone board after the restructuring of the New Zealand Rugby League. He was nominated to serve on the New Zealand Rugby League board in 2012 as an independent director.

In 2003, Ropati was appointed Principal of Penrose High School (now One Tree Hill College), having previously served as Deputy Principal. In 2010, Ropati joined Howick College as Principal. After spending 12 years at Howick College, in 2022 Ropati left the school to start a new position as Principal at Tauranga's Papamoa College.

Family
His family is famous in rugby league circles and includes brothers Joe, Peter, Tea and Romi. He now has a family of 4, married to Kerrie Lee Ropati with two daughters Olivia Nancy Ropati and Georgia Lee Ropati.

References

1968 births
Living people
Auckland rugby league team players
Featherstone Rovers players
Mangere East Hawks players
Manurewa Marlins players
New Zealand educators
New Zealand national rugby league team players
New Zealand sportspeople of Samoan descent
New Zealand expatriate sportspeople in England
New Zealand rugby league administrators
New Zealand Rugby League board members
New Zealand rugby league players
New Zealand Warriors players
Oldham R.L.F.C. players
Otahuhu Leopards players
Parramatta Eels players
People educated at Otahuhu College
Iva
Rugby league centres
Samoan rugby league players
Sheffield Eagles (1984) players
Taranaki rugby league team players
Te Atatu Roosters players
People educated at Lynfield College